Pepperpot is an Amerindian-derived dish popular in Guyana. It is traditionally served at Christmas and other special events. Along with chicken curry, and cook-up rice, pepperpot is one of Guyana's national dishes.

Pepperpot is a stewed meat dish, strongly flavoured with cinnamon, cassareep (a special sauce made from the cassava root) and other basic ingredients, including Caribbean hot peppers. Beef, pork, and  mutton are the most popular meats used, though some have been known to use chicken. Pepperpot is popularly served with a dense Guyanese-style homemade or home-style bread, rice, or roti. It can also be served with boiled vegetables such as cassava, eddoes, sweet potatoes, and green or ripe plantains. 

This dish is usually reserved for special occasions because it needs to cook for several hours, and mostly eaten on Christmas Day or during the Christmas holiday season, and sometimes on Boxing Day. Like the original Amerindian version it is usually made in a large pot and can be reheated and eaten over several days because the cassareep starts preserving the meat. Versions of the dish are also served in several other countries in the Caribbean, including Trinidad and Tobago, Grenada, St. Vincent and Jamaica.

See also
 List of meat dishes
 List of stews
 Philadelphia Pepper Pot

References

External links 

 Pepperpot… A Traditional Guyanese Christmas Breakfast
 Guyanese Pepperpot recipe

National dishes
Guyanese cuisine
Meat stews
Meat dishes
Native American cuisine
Christmas food